The 2014 Big Sky Conference men's basketball tournament ran from March 14–16, 2014. The champion Weber State Wildcats received an automatic bid to the 2014 NCAA tournament.

Format
Unlike most Division I conference tournaments in basketball, the Big Sky tournament does not involve all of the conference's teams. With the addition of North Dakota and Southern Utah to the conference for the 2012–13 season, expanding the number of teams from 9 to 11, the tournament expanded from six teams to seven. As in previous years, qualifying was based on overall conference record. The number of teams that failed to qualify also increased by one, going from three to four. All tournament games were played at the site of the regular-season champion. The men's tournament also returned to a Thursday-Friday-Saturday format.  The field was re-seeded after the first round so the #1 seed played the lowest remaining seed, while the highest remaining seeds faced off in the other semifinal.

Bracket

References

External links
 2014 Men's Basketball Championship

2013–14 Big Sky Conference men's basketball season
Big Sky Conference men's basketball tournament
Big Sky Conference men's basketball tournament
Big Sky Conference men's basketball tournament
Basketball competitions in Ogden, Utah
College sports tournaments in Utah